WTPH-LP, UHF analog channel 14, was a low powered Azteca America-affiliated television station licensed to Fort Myers, Florida, United States. The station was owned by Tu Programmacion Hispana, LLC.

WTPH-LP's license was cancelled by the Federal Communications Commission on September 24, 2013, due to the station's failure to file an application for license renewal.

External links

Television channels and stations established in 2003
TPH-LP
Mass media in Fort Myers, Florida
TPH-LP
Defunct television stations in the United States
Television channels and stations disestablished in 2013
2003 establishments in Florida
2013 disestablishments in Florida
TPH-LP